Gal Hirsch (born 1964) is an Israeli brigadier general (Tat aluf) who commanded the 91st Division of Israel Defense Forces during the 2006 Lebanon War, and the president of NEWSRAEL.

Biography
Gal Hirsch was born to Rachel and Yitzhak Hirsch, who were among the first residents of Arad, in the Negev. His grandparents on both sides of his family served in the Haganah. When Hirsch was 13 years old, his uncle, Amnon Hager, fell in the line of duty, in the 1977 Israeli Air Force Sikorsky CH-53 Sea Stallion crash disaster. The incident led Hirsch to enroll to a military boarding school affiliated with the Herzliya Hebrew Gymnasium in Tel-Aviv, at the age of 14. Hirsch has a B.A in Mid-Eastern Studies from Bar-Ilan University (Graduated with honors) and an M.B.A from Tel-Aviv University.

Military service
Hirsch was drafted into the IDF in 1982. He volunteered as a paratrooper in the Paratroopers Brigade. He served as a soldier and a squad leader. In 1985 he became an infantry officer after completing Officer Candidate School and returned to the Paratroopers Brigade as a platoon leader. Hirsch fought as a company commander in Operation Law and Order in Lebanon. He led the 202 Paratroop Battalion in South Lebanon and in the First Intifada. He led Shaldag Unit in special operations in Lebanon.

He was later assigned as the G-3 of the Judea and Samaria Division, and was severely injured when terrorists threw a large rock on his car. Hirsch underwent a lengthy rehabilitation process that lasted about a year, at the end of which he was permanently disabled. After the rehabilitation, he returned to serve as Benjamin Regional Brigade commander during the Second Intifada. Later served as IDF's Central Command's J-3, during Operation Defensive Shield. Then he was given command of the IDF's Officer Candidate School (Bahad 1).

Hirsch commanded the 91st Division of Israel Defense Forces during the 2006 Lebanon War. After the war he became the scapegoat for the widespread frustration in Israel, having had direct responsibility both for the abduction affair and the battles of Bint Jbeil and Ayta ash-Sha'b, in which Israel failed to occupy the two towns in spite of suffering high casualties. He was forced to resign a few months after the war.

In February 2012, he was called back to an operational-command position in the IDF, and was appointed deputy commander (Res.) In the new Depth Command headquarters established by the chief of staff, Lt. Col. Benny Gantz.

In August 2015, Hirsch completed his role as Deputy Commander of Depth Command after three and a half years of service. At the exchange ceremony, Chief of Staff Lt. Gen. Gadi Eizenkot praised Hirsch's performance in the Second Lebanon War, saying that northerners owe him nine years of peace and that after the dust settled and the post-war public hysteria the performance of the Galilee under Hirsch was clearly visible. In the war - a performance that brought peace to the north.

Among his positions in the reserve, Hirsch also serves as a lecturer in command courses in the IDF.

Career
Hirsch is a member of the Israel-UK-Australia Strategic Leadership Forum. Since 2008, Hirsch is a research associate at the International Institute for Counter-Terrorism in Herzliya.

In January 2017, he was awarded the Exemplary Graduate Award by the Association of Military Boarding Schools, for his exemplary work in the IDF and in civilian life.

In April 2020, he volunteered to serve as chief of staff to combat the COVID-19 plague in the city of Elad. In May 2020, Hirsch began serving as president of the pro-Israel live feed company - NEWSRAEL.

Personal life
Hirsch is married to Donna and has three children. He lives in Rosh HaAyin.

Books and Publications
Gal Hirsch published his first book, "Love Story, War Story", in 2009. The book is an autobiographic tale of his military career, and a depiction of a brigadier general's perspective of 2006 Lebanon War. The book appeared on the bestseller list for months following its publication. In 2016, Hirsch published "Defensive Shield", a new and revised English edition of his first book, providing a unique description of Israeli national defense developments and challenges. In 2020, Hirsch published "Follow Me", The leadership philosophy of Brigadier-General Hirsch condensed into eighteen crucial lessons.

In August 2016, director Yair Elazar produced a documentary about Hirsch entitled "Gal Hirsch - A War Story". The film described as an intimate glimpse into the life and career of Brigadier General Hirsch. In his own words Gal tells the story of the Second Lebanon War when he commanded the Galillee Division and the battles on Israel's northern borders. He also reveals the hidden war that took place behind his back following an incident when two soldiers were kidnapped under his watch. Gal sets out to clear his name after being forced to leave the army. Backed by Supreme Court Justice, Eliahu Winograd, he and Yair Elazar, the son of a Chief of Staff on the Yom Kippur war, "Dado", go out to correct an injustice by a military leadership that renounced responsibility for a bloody war.

During the years, Hirsch published several academic articles, regarding military, public defense, guerilla warfare, and more. Amongst his publications:

"Izz ad-Din al-Qassam, His life and Legacy", History Department, Joint Doctrine.

Division Publications: 1989 "Low Signature Operations", IDF Joint Doctrine

Division Publications: 1999," Mixed Arena – Armed Riots in Asymmetric Conflicts", Ground Forces Publications: 2001.

"Operations in the Speed of Thought", Maarachot: 2002 The Path to ‘Defensive Shield Operation’ – A Campaign Evolvement in Central Command, Maarachot: 2003

"Combat Navigation" in 2004 Zeev Erlich ed., The Path tale – Handbook for Navigation training.

"ON DINOSAURS AND HORNETS: A critical View on Operational Moulds in Asymmetric Conflicts", Royal United Services Institute (RUSI) for defense and Security Studies, London, August 2003, vol 148 No 4.

"From Cast lead to another way – the development of the Conflict in central command 2000 to 2003" (2004) in Maarachot IDF official Publication 393 February 2004

"Here I am, Send me! Combat leadership in the IDF" (2004) – Infantry and paratrooper’s Magazine Israel Army IDF November 2004.

"The Sixth Dimension Has Taken Off" (2013), Israel Defense, October 2013.

References

External links 

 Gal Hirsch Official Website
 Gal Hirsch on Facebook
 Brig. Gen. (Res.) Gal Hirsch on Israel-Lebanon Maritime Border Talks - I24 News
Tour to Prophet Samuel’s Tomb with Brigadier General (Res.) Gal Hirsch

1964 births
Israeli generals
Living people
Israeli military personnel
Bar-Ilan University alumni